The 1987 200 Meilen von Nürnberg was the sixth round of the 1987 World Sports-Prototype Championship, known as the ADAC Norisring Trophäe, as well as the second round of the 1987 German Supercup, known as the Bilstein Cup. It took place at the Norisring temporary street circuit, West Germany on June 28, 1987.

Format
The Norisring 200 Miles combined several competitors from the World Championship as well as a majority of entrants from the German Supercup championship.  The event was run as two separate races, each running for 100 miles (77 laps). The first race would consist of the entire field, and points for the German Supercup championship were awarded based on the results of this first race.

Cars which did not complete the first race, either due to accidents or mechanical failures, were not allowed to compete in the second race. Those which remained started in the same position in which they had finished the first race, and then completed the second  race. The result of this race however did not count towards the Supercup. Instead, the laps totals from the two races were combined in order to determine an overall race winner, which earned points in the World Championship.

All teams consisted of two drivers, each of which ran one race apiece. Only the driver in the first race earned points in the Supercup, while both drivers earned points in the World Championship.

Official results
Class winners in bold.

Race 1
The 1987 Bilstein Cup and round two of the 1987 German Supercup.

† - #9 Blaupunkt Joest Racing was disqualified after Race 2 when the car was found to have an oversized fuel tank.  Both runs were therefore disqualified.

‡ - #14 Mussato Action Car was disqualified during the race for using an external starter motor.

 - #103 John Bartlett Racing and #121 GP Motorsport were both disqualified for having started the race illegally.

Race 2

† - #9 Blaupunkt Joest Racing was disqualified after Race 2 when the car was found to have an oversized fuel tank.  Both runs were therefore disqualified.

Overall results
Total laps from the two races combined for the ADAC Norisring Trophäe and round six of the World Sports-Prototype Championship.  Drivers are listed in the order in which they raced or planned to race.

Statistics
 Pole Position (Race 1 only) - #17 Porsche AG - 0:47.070
 Average Speed - 163.898 km/h

References

 
 
 

Norisring
Norisring
1987 in Bavaria